Mosakutty is a 2014 Tamil-language drama film directed by M. Jeevan and produced by John Max under the banner of Shalom Studios. It features actors Veera and Mahima Nambiar in the lead roles. The film is set in Madurai and Kerala. The film marks the acting debut of doctor Veera.

Plot 

Mosakki works as a henchman for Virumandi. He gets in trouble when he falls in love with Virumandi's daughter.

Cast 
 Veera as Mosakutty Bala (Mosakki)
 Mahima Nambiar as Kayalvizhi
 Joe Malloori as Virumandi 
 Sendrayan as Sendru, Mosakutty's friend
 Pasupathy
 M. S. Bhaskar as Malayali
 Meenal
 Jangiri Madhumitha
 Scissor Manohar
 Ananth
KS Thangasamy as a police officer
 Yaar Kannan

Music 

The soundtrack of the film has been given by Ramesh Vinayakam, while lyrics have been penned by M. Jeevan. The album, featuring 5 songs, was launched on 25 July 2014 at Sathyam Cinemas with the principal cast and crew and celebrities including directors Bharathiraja and Prabhu Solomon, actor Sivakarthikeyan and producer R. B. Choudary in attendance.

Reception 
The Deccan Chronicle wrote that "Though it is a usual love story, director Jeevan has attempted a different screenplay and the settings are also new".

References

External links 
 

2014 films
2010s Tamil-language films
Films scored by Ramesh Vinayakam